This list shows military equipment used by the mujahideen during the Soviet–Afghan War. The Mujahideen obtained weapons from many sources, mostly supplied by foreign sources, such as the Central Intelligence Agency’s Operation Cyclone, China, Egypt, Iran and the United Kingdom, and channeled through Pakistan. Many weapons were also captured from the Soviet Army or the Democratic Republic of Afghanistan’s Afghan National Army.

Small arms

Heavy weapons
This includes anti-air and anti-tank weapons used by the Mujahideen, also artillery.

Vehicles

The Mujahideen acquired substantial amounts of armoured vehicles from the DRA, both captured during combat and brought over by defectors but the lack of trained personnel, spare parts and the prevalence of Soviet airpower meant that they were seldom used.

|KrAZ-255

Gallery

References

Military equipment of Afghanistan
Soviet–Afghan War
Mujahideen
Soviet–Afghan
Mujahideen